Highway 983 is a provincial highway in the east central region of the Canadian province of Saskatchewan.

It runs from Highway 984 near Somme and McNab Creek to Highway 982 near the Pepaw Lake Recreation Site. The highway's route from west to east follows along the Piwei River, Pepaw River, Eldredge Lake, McBride Lake, through the McBride Lake Recreation Site, and on to Highway 982 near Pepaw Lake. Highway 983 is about 54 km (34 mi) long.

Highway 983 also connects with Highway 9 near where the Etomami River meets the Piwei River.

See also
Roads in Saskatchewan
Transportation in Saskatchewan

References

983